The 1995–96 Japan Ice Hockey League season was the 30th season of the Japan Ice Hockey League. Six teams participated in the league, and the Seibu Tetsudo won the championship.

Regular season

Final
 Seibu Tetsudo - Shin Oji Seishi 3:0 (4:2, 7:6, 5:2)

External links
 Japan Ice Hockey Federation

Japan
Ice Hock
Japan Ice Hockey League seasons
Japan